Nandinagari is a Unicode block containing characters for Nandinagari script, historically used to write Sanskrit in southern India.

History
The following Unicode-related documents record the purpose and process of defining specific characters in the Nandinagari block:

References 

Unicode blocks